The 1978 NCAA Men's Water Polo Championship was the 10th annual NCAA Men's Water Polo Championship to determine the national champion of NCAA men's college water polo. Tournament matches were played at the Belmont Plaza Pool in Long Beach, California during December 1978.

Stanford defeated California in the final, 7–6 (in three overtimes), to win their second national title.

For the second consecutive year, the leading scorer for the tournament was Scott Schulte from Bucknell (13 goals). There was no Most Outstanding Player for this tournament, but an All-Tournament Team, consisting of seven players, was named.

Qualification
Since there has only ever been one single national championship for water polo, all NCAA men's water polo programs (whether from Division I, Division II, or Division III) were eligible. A total of 8 teams were invited to contest this championship.

Bracket
Site: Belmont Plaza Pool, Long Beach, California

All-tournament team 
Rob Arnold, Stanford
Doug Burke, Stanford
Peter Campbell, UC Irvine
John Gansel, Stanford
Kevin Robertson, California
Terry Schroeder, Pepperdine
Carlos Steffens, California

See also 
 NCAA Men's Water Polo Championship

References

NCAA Men's Water Polo Championship
NCAA Men's Water Polo Championship
1978 in sports in California
December 1978 sports events in the United States
1973